Tomka may refer to:
Béla Tomka (b. 1962), Hungarian historian
István Tomka, musician
Peter Tomka (b. 1956), Slovak diplomat
An alternate spelling of Tom kha kai, a soup in Lao and Thai cuisine.
Tomka gas test site, German chemical weapons facility in Soviet Union (1928-1931)
Tomka River, a river in Novosibirsk Oblast, Russia